This is the discography of the Russian heavy metal band Aria.

Studio albums

Singles

Live albums

DVDs

Compilations

Soundtracks

Tribute Albums

Side projects

References 

 
Heavy metal group discographies
Discographies of Russian artists